Siah Khan (also Romanized as Sīāh Khān; also known as Deh-e Sīāh Khān) is a village in Dust Mohammad Rural District, in the Central District of Hirmand County, Sistan and Baluchestan Province, Iran. At the 2006 census, its population was 10, in 4 families.

References 

Populated places in Hirmand County